Cindy Thái Tài  was born Nguyễn Thái Tài  in Vietnam. In 2005, she underwent sex reassignment surgery at Yanhee International Hospital in Thailand. Afterwards, she became a well-known singer in her home country, releasing albums in 2006 and 2007.  She sometimes appears on My Best Gay Friends, a Vietnamese web series. She was the first Vietnamese person to publicize herself as a transgender.

References

External links

20th-century births
Living people
Vietnamese LGBT singers
Transgender women musicians
Transgender female models
21st-century Vietnamese women singers
Year of birth missing (living people)
21st-century LGBT people
Vietnamese women singers
Vietnamese actresses
Transgender singers